Johann Jakob Scherer (10 November 1825 – 23 December 1878) was a Swiss politician.

He was elected to the Swiss Federal Council on 12 July 1872 and died in office on 23 December 1878. He was affiliated to the Free Democratic Party of Switzerland.

During his time in office he held the following departments:
Department of Finance (1872–1873)
Department of Railway and Trade (1873–1874)
Political Department (1875)
Military Department (1876–1878)
He was President of the Confederation in 1875.

References

External links

1825 births
1878 deaths
People from Horgen District
Swiss Calvinist and Reformed Christians
Free Democratic Party of Switzerland politicians
Foreign ministers of Switzerland
Finance ministers of Switzerland
Members of the Federal Council (Switzerland)
Members of the National Council (Switzerland)